Umberto Trippa (6 April 1931 – 18 December 2015) was an Italian wrestler. He competed in the Greco-Roman featherweight division at the 1952, 1956 and 1960 Olympics and finished in fourth, sixth and fourth place, respectively. He won the silver medal in this event at the 1953 World Championships. Moreover, he was eight times absolute Italian champion.

References

1931 births
2015 deaths
Olympic wrestlers of Italy
Wrestlers at the 1952 Summer Olympics
Wrestlers at the 1956 Summer Olympics
Wrestlers at the 1960 Summer Olympics
Italian male sport wrestlers
World Wrestling Championships medalists